In enzymology, a L-pipecolate oxidase is an enzyme that catalyzes the chemical reaction

L-pipecolate + O2  2,3,4,5-tetrahydropyridine-2-carboxylate + H2O2

Thus, the two substrates of this enzyme are L-pipecolate and O2, whereas its two products are 2,3,4,5-tetrahydropyridine-2-carboxylate and H2O2.

This enzyme belongs to the family of oxidoreductases, specifically those acting on the CH-NH group of donors with oxygen as acceptor.  The systematic name of this enzyme class is L-pipecolate:oxygen 1,6-oxidoreductase. Other names in common use include pipecolate oxidase, and L-pipecolic acid oxidase.  This enzyme participates in lysine degradation.

References

 
 

EC 1.5.3
Enzymes of unknown structure